The 2011 Georgia State Panthers football team represented Georgia State University in the 2011 NCAA Division I FCS football season. The Panthers were led by second year head coach Bill Curry and played their home games at the Georgia Dome. Although Georgia State is a full member of the Colonial Athletic Association (CAA), the Panthers played as an FCS independent. This was their second season in program history and last as an independent. They became a football member of the CAA in 2012. They finished the season with a record of 3-8.

Schedule

References

Georgia State
Georgia State Panthers football seasons
Georgia State Panthers football